

Practice areas 

ISFIN gathers specialists from independent partner firms from numerous countries, with coverage in more than 75 targeted countries (see list of partner firms below), enabling it to provide any company with global (but locally-specific) advice in all aspects of Emerging Markets (Shariah-compliant, Shariah investments and conventional transactions).

The objectives of the ISFIN organization are to help Islamic investors investing in Western countries and Western investors investing in Islamic countries, including advice on tax structuring. ISFIN also helps Western governments to configure their tax regulations so as to promote Islamic investment in their countries.

ISFIN is an innovative concept that accelerates your international business strategy: ISFIN Business model was recognized by the FINANCIAL TIMES Innovation awards.
ISFIN combines the expertise of international business consultants with the best locally based professional experts (lawyers, accountants).
We advise corporations, public entities, investors and professional firms interested in growth markets.
We help source financing and investments in 5 continents.
We accompany investments from the high growth markets into the West, and Western investments into the emerging world.

Awards 

IsFin was recognized and nominated by the Financial Times as most innovative project in the “Corporate Strategy” section in 2012.

Locations 

Belgium: Brussels
Malaysia: Kuala Lumpur
UK: London

See also 

Islamic banking
Islamic finance
Islamic Development Bank
Shariah Board
Islamic Fiqh Academy (disambiguation)

References

External links 
Official website of the Islamic Financial Services Board (IFSB)
Official website of IsFin
Official website of International Islamic Financial Market (IIFM)

Sharia in Europe
International law organizations
International organisations based in Belgium